The 2017 Saint Francis Red Flash football team represented Saint Francis University in the 2017 NCAA Division I FCS football season. They were led by eighth-year head coach Chris Villarrial and played their home games at DeGol Field. They were a member of the Northeast Conference. They finished the season 5–6, 3–3 in NEC play to finish in fourth place.

Schedule 

 Source: Schedule

Game summaries

Lock Haven

Wagner

Towson

at Liberty

at Presbyterian

at Bryant

at Duquesne

Robert Morris

at Central Connecticut

Sacred Heart

at Eastern Kentucky

References

Saint Francis
Saint Francis Red Flash football seasons
Saint Francis Red Flash football